The Pointe de la Galoppaz, elevation , is a mountain in the Bauges Massif in Savoie, France.

Mountains of the Alps
Mountains of Savoie